Gondwana, also known as Gondaranya, is a region of India, named after the Gondi people who live there (though they can also be found in other parts of India). The name of the ancient continent of Gondwanaland was derived from Gondwana, because some of the earliest rock formations of this continent were first investigated in part of the region, in modern Odisha.

As Gondi people are spread widely across central India, and are a minority almost everywhere, there is no unambiguous boundary to the region. However, the core region can be considered to be the eastern part of the Vidarbha region of Maharashtra, Garha Kingdom the parts of Madhya Pradesh immediately to the north of it, and parts of the west of Chhattisgarh. The wider region extends into parts of northern Telangana, western Odisha and southern Uttar Pradesh.

The region is part of the northern Deccan plateau, with an average height of about 600–700 metres. Much of it is rugged and hilly. Geologically it is mostly Pre-Cambrian rock, with some areas dated to Permian and Triassic periods. Part of it is overlaid with alluvium, and in the west it is overlaid with the igneous rocks of the Deccan Traps.

The climate is hot and semi-arid. The natural vegetation is dry monsoon forest, or monsoon scrub forest. Large parts of it are still forest, and it contains several national parks, including tiger populations.

Gondwana has a relatively high proportion of peoples of the "scheduled tribes" of India, which include the Gonds. The scheduled tribes are recognised as economically and socially disadvantaged. They form a majority of the population in many districts.

Gonds are followers of religion based on Hinduism Gondi people

History
A number of old kingdoms were established by, or together with, ruling families of the Gondis and other scheduled tribes in this region. The first of these is mentioned in 1398, when Narsingh Rai, King of Kherla, Madhya Pradesh, is said by a Ferishta to have ruled all the hills of Gondwana. He was finally overthrown and killed by Hoshang Shah, king of Malwa. Between the 14th and the 18th centuries, three main Gond kingdoms existed; Garha-Mandla occupied the upper Narmada River Valley, Deogarh-Nagpur occupied the Kanhan River and upper Wainganga River valleys, and Chandra-Sirpur occupied present-day Chandrapur, Gadchiroli, and eastern Adilabad districts.

The three Gondi principalities of Garha-Mandla, Deogarh, and Chanda-Sirpur were nominally subject to the Mughal emperors. In addition to the acquisitions made in the north at the expense of Garha-Mandla, the Mughals, after the annexation of Berar in 1595, established governors at Paunar in Wardha District and Kherla in Betul District. Having thus hemmed in the Gond states, however, they could not assert any effective sovereignty over them; the Gond kings enjoyed practical independence within their own dominions. After the defeat and subsequent fall of the Mughals, Gondwana came under the rule of the Bundela and Maratha empires.

In the 17th century Chhatar Sal, the Bundela chieftain, deprived the Mandla principality of part of the Vindhyan Plateau and the Narmada Valley. In 1733 the Maratha Peshwa won Bundelkhand; and in 1735 the Marathas had established their power in Saugor. In 1742 the Peshwa advanced to Mandla and exacted tribute, and from this time until 1781, when Gond dynasty of Garha-Mandla was finally overthrown, Garha-Mandla remained practically a Maratha dependency. Meanwhile, the other independent principalities of Gondwana had in turn succumbed. In 1743 Raghoji Bhonsle of Berar established himself at Nagpur, and by 1751 had conquered the territories of Deogarh, Chanda, and Chhattisgarh.

The economic disadvantage to which the tribal people are now subject is often ascribed to the Maratha conquest of the region in the 18th century , followed by the British imposition of the permanent settlement in the 19th century. A number of rebellions against British rule took place throughout the 19th century. Some of these rebellions focused on protection of forests against commercial logging.

Emblem of Gondwana State

For over a millennium in South Asia, the visual trope of a triumphant lion vanquishing one or several elephants has been common in architectural sculpture, both in the round and in relief. In the rather limited scholarship on this motif, diverse interpretations have been offered. Although its presence has remained fairly stable through time, there exist many minor variations on this motif, including the use of leonine creatures variously described as vyālas or yālīs, and the incorporation of other fantastic creatures known popularly as makaras in such combats. In South India, the myth of the fantastic composite animal called the Śarabha takes this imagery yet further. Yet, the simple image of a lion victorious over one or more elephants was situated very strategically within certain architectural programs for given periods and places. For example, Gondwana Kingdom forts,Deccani forts constructed between the fifteenth and seventeenth centuries carried this representation on their barbicans and gateways . While tracing the history of this visual motif.

Gondwana Express 
 
The Gondwana express train runs between Raigarh and Hazrat Nizamuddin in India. It is a 5-day service. It operates as train number 12409 from Raigarh to Hazrat Nizamuddin and as train number 12410 in the reverse direction after the name of Gondwana kingdom.

Popular movements
 
Political and communal movements directed against the dominant political structure still occur in the region, including the Gondwana Praja Party, founded in 2014 in Maharashtra state.
Gondwana Praja Party founded for the demanded the new formation of old Gondwana State for the tribal people of central India instead of old Vidarbha region. Gondwana Ganatantra Party is also established. The founder of Gondwana Gadtantra Party is Heera Singh Markam. He is the only Member of Parliament of this party.

References

Sources
 McEldowney, Philip F. (1980) Colonial Administration and Social Developments in middle India: The Central Provinces, 1861-1921. Ph.D. Dissertation, University of Virginia.
 

Regions of India
Regions of Madhya Pradesh
Regions of Odisha
Proposed states and union territories of India
Regions of Maharashtra